Thomas Webb & Sons was an English glass company, founded in 1837 by Thomas Webb (1804-1869) near Stourbridge, England. The name T. Webb & Co. was adopted in 1842, and later became Thomas Webb & Sons. Webb operated the Platts glasshouse from 1837 to 1856 and then the Dennis glassworks from 1855 to 1990.

The company, known originally as the "Crystal King of England," was noted for the high quality of its Cameo glass. Cameo glass is created by a process of etching and carving through a layer of opaque white glass, leaving a white relief design on a darker colored glass body. Some pieces used two layers of etched glass to create a three-color Cameo glass product. In the 1870s John Northwood produced the first pieces, inspired by the Portland Vase. George Woodall would produce the most distinguished Webb Cameo work towards the end of the 19th century.

The finest and most valuable pieces were signed with "GEM CAMEO" included in the mark - Roman cameo glass was itself an imitation of the luxury art form of the cameo engraved gem.

In 1889 Thomas Webb & Sons secured an American patent for their process, and in that same year they received a Grand Prix for their exquisite colored glass at the 1889 Paris Exposition. They were part of the Tiffany & Co. exhibit at the exposition.

Examples

References

External links

The Glass Association
The Cameo Glass of Thomas and George Woodall
Poster Stamp

Glassmaking companies of England
Companies based in Dudley